Caged Bird may refer to:
Caged bird, a bird kept in a birdcage
"Caged Bird", a song by Alicia Keys on her 2001 album Songs in A Minor
"Caged Bird" (Wonderfalls), a 2004 episode of the TV dramedy Wonderfalls
The Caged Bird, a 1913 American silent short drama film